Bleeding order is a term used in phonology to describe specific interactions of phonological rules. The term was introduced in 1968 by Paul Kiparsky. If two phonological rules are said to be in bleeding order, the application of the first rule creates a context in which the second rule can no longer apply.

The opposite of this is called feeding order.

Examples
In the output form  (buses), final devoicing has not applied, because the phonological context in which this rule could have applied has gone as a consequence of the application of -insertion. Put differently, the application order "(1) -insertion (2) final devoicing" is a bleeding order in English.

Counterbleeding order

If two rules which would have a bleeding relationship in one order actually apply in the opposite order, the latter is called a counterbleeding order. An example of this can be seen in the pronunciation of the diminutive of the word slang ("snake") in the Dutch dialect of Kaatsheuvel: . If [s]-insertion had applied first, then the rule which inserts an additional  between the noun stem and the suffix  could no longer have applied and the output form would have been . However, the rules have applied in the reverse order.

See also 
 Feeding order
 Markedness
 Optimality theory
 Phonological opacity

Literature
Gussenhoven, C. & Jacobs, H. (1998). Understanding Phonology. Arnold, Londen.
Jensen, J.T. (2004). Principles of Generative Phonology: An introduction

References 

Phonology
Sound changes
Phonotactics